Rohi is a Multan-based news channel relaunched on May 27, 2017. The channel is owned by Mohsin Naqvi , the founder of City News Group, which he bought from a Pakistani politician, Jahangir Tareen. Naqvi is politically affiliated with Chaudhrys of Gujrat through marriage.

Rohi also broadcasts Multan Division news which include:
 Khanewal District
 Lodhran District
 Multan District
 Vehari District

References

Television channels and stations established in 2017
24-hour television news channels in Pakistan
Television networks in Pakistan
Mass media in Multan